But for All These Shrinking Hearts is the fifth studio album by Australian musician, Josh Pyke. It was his first on new label Wonderlick Entertainment and released in July 2015. The album peaked at number 2 on the ARIA Charts.

The album's title came from a line of poetry Pyke jotted down while on tour in London for his last album: "You are a shadow held aloft in a world less vast but for all these shrinking hearts". Pyke said he wrote it feeling disillusioned with the world saying "It feels like everyone's hearts are shrinking a bit, at a time when we should be more open hearted".

Reception
James Di Fabrizio from Beat Magazine said the album found Pyke "in the middle ground between consolidating and experimenting with his lyrically illustrative and classically melodic style." Di Fabrizio said "Lyrically, much of the album deals with Pyke's relationship with creativity and his longstanding pursuit of it."

Elisa Parry from Music Feeds said "While But for All These Shrinking Hearts has everything you'd want from a Josh Pyke album – intricate melodies, exquisite harmonies and choruses that will worm their way into your head after just one listen – there's also a whole lot more going on here." and concluded the review saying "Like all good songs, the stories will stay with you and get you thinking. Thematically it all comes back to the idea of motion, of moving forward creatively, personally and as a society. But don't worry; if you were just hanging out for a few more love songs, you won't be disappointed."

Track listing 

 all songs written by Josh Pyke unless noted.

Charts

Release history

References

2015 albums
Josh Pyke albums
Sony Music Australia albums